Udagalauda is a village in Sri Lanka. It is located within Central Province and is the Colombo time zone.

See also
List of towns in Central Province, Sri Lanka

References

External links

Populated places in Nuwara Eliya District